The Treaty of Sèvres was a 1920 treaty signed between the Allies of World War I and the Ottoman Empire. The treaty ceded large parts of Ottoman territory to France, the United Kingdom, Greece and Italy, as well as creating large occupation zones within the Ottoman Empire. It was one of a series of treaties that the Central Powers signed with the Allied Powers after their defeat in World War I. Hostilities had already ended with the Armistice of Mudros.

The treaty was signed on 10 August 1920 in an exhibition room at the Manufacture nationale de Sèvres porcelain factory in Sèvres, France.

The Treaty of Sèvres marked the beginning of the partitioning of the Ottoman Empire. The treaty's stipulations included the renunciation of most territory not inhabited by Turkish people and their cession to the Allied administration.

The ceding of Eastern Mediterranean lands saw the introduction of novel polities, including the British Mandate for Palestine and the French Mandate for Syria and Lebanon.

The terms stirred hostility and Turkish nationalism. The treaty's signatories were stripped of their citizenship by the Grand National Assembly, led by Mustafa Kemal Pasha, which ignited the Turkish War of Independence. Hostilities with Britain over the neutral zone of the Straits were narrowly avoided in the Chanak Crisis of September 1922, when the Armistice of Mudanya was concluded on 11 October, leading the former Allies of World War I to return to the negotiating table with the Turks in November 1922. The 1923 Treaty of Lausanne, which superseded the Treaty of Sèvres, ended the conflict and saw the establishment of the Republic of Turkey.

Summary

Parties
George Dixon Grahame signed for the United Kingdom, Alexandre Millerand for France and Count Lelio Longare for Italy. One Allied power, Greece, did not accept the borders as drawn, mainly because of the political change after the 1920 Greek legislative election and so never ratified the treaty. There were three signatories for the Ottoman Empire:

 Ex-Ambassador Hadi Pasha,
 Ex-Minister of Education Rıza Tevfik Bölükbaşı, 
 Second secretary of the Ottoman embassy in Bern, Reşad Halis.

The Russian Soviet Federative Socialist Republic was not a party to the treaty because it had negotiated the Treaty of Brest-Litovsk with the Ottoman Empire in 1918.

The Treaty of Versailles was signed with the German Empire before the Treaty of Sèvres and annulled German concessions in the Ottoman sphere, including economic rights and enterprises.

Also, France, Britain, and Italy signed a Tripartite Agreement on the same date. It confirmed Britain's oil and commercial concessions and turned the former German enterprises in the Ottoman Empire over to a tripartite corporation.

The United States, having refused in the Senate to assume a League of Nations mandate over Armenia, decided not to participate in the partitioning of the Ottoman Empire. The US wanted a permanent peace as quickly as possible, with financial compensation for its military expenditure. However, after the Senate rejected the Armenian mandate, the only US hope was its inclusion in the treaty by the influential Greek Prime Minister Eleftherios Venizelos.

Provisions 
thumb|upright=1.4|Original map from 1920 illustrating the Treaty of Sèvres region (not depicting the zones of influences)
The treaty imposed a number of territorial losses on Turkey and had a number of provisions that applied to the territory recognised as belonging to Turkey.

Non-territorial

Financial restrictions 
The Allies were to control the Ottoman Empire's finances, such as approving and supervising the national budget, implementing financial laws and regulations and totally controlling the Ottoman Bank. The Ottoman Public Debt Administration, instituted in 1881, was redesigned to include only British, French, and Italian bondholders. The Ottoman debt problem had dated back to the time of the Crimean War (1854–1856) during which the Ottoman Empire had borrowed money from abroad, mainly from France. Also the capitulations of the Ottoman Empire, which had been abolished in 1914 by Talaat Pasha, were restored.

The empire was required to grant freedom of transit to people, goods, vessels etc. passing through its territory, and goods in transit were to be free of all customs duties. Future changes to the tax system, the customs system, internal and external loans, import and export duties and concessions would need the consent of the financial commission of the Allied Powers to be implemented. To forestall the economic repenetration of Germany, Austria, Hungary or Bulgaria, the treaty demanded the empire to liquidate the property of citizens of those countries living within its territories. The public liquidation was to be organized by the Reparations Commission. Property rights of the Baghdad Railway were to pass from German control.

Military restrictions
The Ottoman Army was to be restricted to 50,700 men, and the Ottoman Navy could maintain only seven sloops and six torpedo boats. The Ottoman Empire was prohibited from creating an air force. The treaty included an interallied commission of control and organisation to supervise the execution of the military clauses.

International trials 

The treaty required determination of those responsible for the Armenian genocide. Article 230 of the Treaty of Sèvres required the Ottoman Empire to "hand over to the Allied Powers the persons whose surrender may be required by the latter as being responsible for the massacres committed during the continuance of the state of war on territory which formed part of the Ottoman Empire on August 1, 1914". However, the inter-allied tribunal attempt to prosecute war criminals as demanded by the Treaty of Sèvres was eventually suspended, and the men who orchestrated the genocide escaped prosecution and traveled relatively freely throughout Europe and Central Asia.

Foreign zones of influence

France 
Within the territory retained by Turkey under the treaty, France received Syria and neighbouring parts of southeastern Anatolia, including Antep, Urfa and Mardin. Cilicia, including Adana, Diyarbakır and large portions of east-central Anatolia all the way north to Sivas and Tokat, were declared a zone of French influence.

Greece 

The Greek government administered the occupation of Smyrna from 21 May 1919. A protectorate was established on 30 July 1922. The treaty transferred "the exercise of her rights of sovereignty to a local parliament" but left the region within the Ottoman Empire. The treaty had Smyrna to be administered by a local parliament, with a plebiscite overseen by the League of Nations after five years to decide if Smyrna's citizens wished to join Greece or to remain in the Ottoman Empire. The treaty accepted Greek administration of the Smyrna enclave, but the area remained under Turkish sovereignty. To protect the Christian population from attacks by the Turkish irregulars, the Greek army expanded its jurisdiction also to nearby cities creating the so-called "Smyrna Zone".

Italy 
Italy was formally given possession of the Dodecanese Islands, which had been under Italian occupation since the Italo-Turkish War of 1911–1912 despite the Treaty of Ouchy according to which Italy should have returned the islands to the Ottoman Empire. Large portions of southern and west-central Anatolia, including the port city of Antalya and the historic Seljuk capital of Konya, were declared to be an Italian zone of influence. Antalya Province had been promised by the Triple Entente to Italy in the Treaty of London, and the Italian colonial authorities wished the zone to become an Italian colony under the name of Lycia.

Territorial provisions

Zone of the Straits 

A Zone of the Straits was proposed to include the Bosphorus, the Dardanelles and the Sea of Marmara. Navigation would be open in the Dardanelles in times of peace and war alike to all vessels of commerce and war, regardless of flag. That would effectively lead to the internationalisation of the waters, which were not to be subject to blockade, and no act of war could be committed there except to enforce decisions of the League of Nations.

Free zones 
Certain ports were to be declared to be of international importance. The League of Nations insisted on the complete freedom and the absolute equality in treatment at such ports, particularly regarding charges and facilities, to ensure that economic provisions in commercially-strategic places were carried out. The regions were to be called "free zones". The ports were Constantinople from San Stefano to Dolmabahçe, Haidar-Pasha, Smyrna, Alexandretta, Haifa, Basra, Trabzon and Batum.

Thrace 
Eastern Thrace (up to the Chatalja line), the islands of Imbros and Tenedos and the islands of the Sea of Marmara were ceded to Greece. The waters surrounding the islands were declared international territory and left to the administration of the "Zone of the Straits".

Kurdistan 
The Kurdistan region, including Mosul Province, was scheduled to have a referendum to decide its fate.

There was no general agreement among Kurds on what the borders of Kurdistan should be because of the disparity between the areas of Kurdish settlement and the political and administrative boundaries of the region. The outlines of Kurdistan as an entity had been proposed in 1919 by Şerif Pasha, who represented the Society for the Elevation of Kurdistan (Kürdistan Teali Cemiyeti) at the Paris Peace Conference. He defined the region's boundaries as follows:

The frontiers of Turkish Kurdistan, from an ethnographical point of view, begin in the north at Ziven, on the Caucasian frontier, and continue westwards to Erzurum, Erzincan, Kemah, Arapgir, Besni and Divick (Divrik?); in the south they follow the line from Harran, Sinjar Mountains, Tel Asfar, Erbil, Süleymaniye, Akk-el-man, Sinne; in the east, Ravandiz, Başkale, Vezirkale, that is to say the frontier of Persia as far as Mount Ararat.

That caused controversy among other Kurdish nationalists, as it excluded the Van Region (possibly as a sop to Armenian claims to that region). Emin Ali Bedir Khan proposed an alternative map that included Van and an outlet to the sea via what is now Turkey's Hatay Province. Amid a joint declaration by Kurdish and Armenian delegations, Kurdish claims concerning Erzurum vilayet and Sassoun (Sason) were dropped, but arguments for sovereignty over Ağrı and Muş remained.

Neither proposal was endorsed by the treaty of Sèvres, which outlined a truncated Kurdistan on what is now Turkish territory (leaving out the Kurds of Iran, British-controlled Iraq and French-controlled Syria). The current Iraqi–Turkish border was agreed upon in July 1926.

Article 63 explicitly granted the full safeguard and protection to the Assyro-Chaldean minority, but that provision was dropped in the Treaty of Lausanne.

Armenia 

Armenia was recognised as a "free and independent" state in Section VI "Armenia", Articles 88-93. By Article 89, "Turkey and Armenia, as well as the other High Contracting Parties agree to submit to the arbitration of the President of the United States of America the question of the frontier to be fixed between Turkey and Armenia in the vilayets of Erzerum, Trebizond, Van and Bitlis, and to accept his decision thereupon, as well as any stipulations he may prescribe as to access for Armenia to the sea, and as to the demilitarisation of any portion of Turkish territory adjacent to the said frontier".

The treaty specified that the frontiers between Armenia and Azerbaijan and Georgia were to be determined by direct negotiation between those states, with the Principle Allied Powers making the decision if those states fail to agree.

British Mandate for Iraq 

The details in the treaty regarding the British Mandate for Iraq were completed on 25 April 1920 at the San Remo Conference. The oil concession in the region was given to the British-controlled Turkish Petroleum Company (TPC), which had held concessionary rights to Mosul Province. British and Iraqi negotiators held acrimonious discussions over the new oil concession. The League of Nations voted on the disposition of Mosul, and the Iraqis feared that without British support, Iraq would lose the area. In March 1925, the TPC was renamed the "Iraq Petroleum Company" (IPC) and granted a full and complete concession for 75 years.

British Mandate for Palestine 

The three principles of the British Balfour Declaration regarding Palestine were adopted in the Treaty of Sèvres:

Article 95: The High Contracting Parties agree to entrust, by application of the provisions of Article 22, the administration of Palestine, within such boundaries as may be determined by the Principal Allied Powers, to a Mandatory to be selected by the said Powers. The Mandatory will be responsible for putting into effect the declaration originally made on 2 November 1917 by the British Government, and adopted by the other Allied Powers, in favour of the establishment in Palestine of a national home for the Jewish people, it being clearly understood that nothing shall be done which may prejudice the civil and religious rights of existing non-Jewish communities in Palestine, or the rights and political status enjoyed by Jews in any other country.

French Mandate for Syria and Lebanon 

The region was divided under the French into four governments as follows: Government of Aleppo, from the Euphrates region to the Mediterranean; Great Lebanon, extending from Tripoli to Palestine; Damascus, including Damascus, Hama, Hems and the Hauran; and the country of Mount Arisarieh. Faisal ibn Husayn, who had been proclaimed king of Syria by a Syrian National Congress in Damascus in March 1920, was ejected by the French in July the same year. The next year, he became king of Iraq.

Kingdom of Hejaz 
The main cities were the Holy Places of Makka, with a population of 80,000, and Medina, with a population of 40,000. Under the Ottomans, it had been the vilayet of Hejaz, but during the war, it became an independent kingdom under British influence.

Abandonment
The Treaty of Sèvres imposed terms on the Ottoman Empire that were far more severe than those imposed on the German Empire by the Treaty of Versailles. France, Italy and Britain had secretly begun planning the partitioning of the Ottoman Empire as early as 1915. The open negotiations covered a period of more than 15 months, started at the Paris Peace Conference of 1919, continued at the Conference of London of February 1920 and took definite shape only after the San Remo Conference in April 1920. The delay occurred because the powers could not come to an agreement, which, in turn, hinged on the outcome of the Turkish National Movement. The Treaty of Sèvres was never ratified, and after the Turkish War of Independence, most of the Treaty of Sèvres's signatories signed and ratified the Treaty of Lausanne in 1923 and 1924. 
 
While the Treaty of Sèvres was still under discussion, the Turkish national movement under Mustafa Kemal Pasha split with the monarchy, based in Constantinople, and set up a Turkish Grand National Assembly in Ankara in April 1920. He demanded for the Turks to fight against the Greeks, who were trying to take the land that had been held by the Ottoman Empire and given to Greece in the treaty. That started the Greco-Turkish War (1919–1922), which resulted in a Turkish victory.

On 18 October, the government of Damat Ferid Pasha was replaced by a provisional one under Ahmed Tevfik Pasha as Grand Vizier, who announced an intention to convene the Senate to ratify the Treaty of Sèvres if national unity was achieved. That required seeking the co-operation of Mustafa Kemal, who expressed disdain for the treaty and started a military assault. As a result, the Turkish government issued a note to the Entente that the ratification of the treaty was impossible at the time.

Eventually, Mustafa Kemal succeeded in his War of Independence and forced most of the former wartime Allies to return to the negotiating table.

Aside from Mustafa Kemal's armed opposition to the treaty in Anatolia, Arabs in Syria were unwilling to accept French rule, the Turks around Mosul attacked the British and Arabs were up in arms against British rule in Baghdad. There was also disorder in Egypt.

Subsequent treaties

During the Turkish War of Independence, the Turkish Army successfully fought Greek, Armenian and French forces and secured the independence of a territory similar to that of present-day Turkey, as was aimed at by the Misak-ı Milli.

The Turkish national movement developed its own international relations with the Treaty of Moscow with Soviet Russia on 16 March 1921, the Accord of Ankara with France putting an end to the Franco-Turkish War, the Treaty of Alexandropol with the Armenians and the Treaty of Kars to fix the eastern borders.

Hostilities with Britain over the neutral zone of the Straits were narrowly avoided in the Chanak Crisis of September 1922, when the Armistice of Mudanya was concluded on 11 October, leading the former Allies of World War I to return to the negotiating table with the Turks in November 1922. That culminated in 1923 in the Treaty of Lausanne, which replaced the Treaty of Sèvres and restored a large territory in Anatolia and Thrace to the Turks. Under the Treaty of Lausanne, France and Italy had only areas of economic interaction, rather than zones of influence. Constantinople was not made an international city, and a demilitarised zone between Turkey and Bulgaria was established.

See also

 Sèvres syndrome
 Paris Peace Conference
 Treaty of Versailles
 Treaty of Saint-Germain-en-Laye
 Treaty of Neuilly-sur-Seine
 Treaty of Trianon
 Minority Treaties
 Sykes–Picot Agreement
 Agreement of Saint-Jean-de-Maurienne

References
 Treaty of Peace between the British Empire and Allied Powers and Turkey UK Treaty Series No. 11 of 1920; Command paper Cmd.964

Notes

Further reading
 Darwin, John, and Beverley Nielsen. Britain, Egypt and the Middle East: Imperial policy in the aftermath of war 1918–1922 (Springer, 1981).
 
 Helmreich, Paul C. From Paris to Sèvres: the partition of the Ottoman Empire at the Peace Conference of 1919-1920 (Ohio State UP, 1974).
 Howard, Harry N. The Partition of Turkey (U of Oklahoma Press, I93i) online
 Karčić, Hamza. "Sèvres at 100: The Peace Treaty that Partitioned the Ottoman Empire." Journal of Muslim Minority Affairs (Sept 2020) 40#3 pp 470-479. https://doi.org/10.1080/13602004.2020.1813988
 Macfie, A. L. “The British Decision Regarding the Future of Constantinople, November 1918-January 1920.” Historical Journal 18#2 (1975), pp. 391–400. online

 Montgomery, A. E. "The Making of the Treaty of Sevres of 10 August 1920." Historical Journal 15#4 (1972): 775-87. online.
 Sion, Abraham. "To Whom Was the Promised Land Promised?" (Mazo, 2020)
 Toynbee, A. J. The Western Question in Greece and Turkey (London, 1922) online 440pp

External links

Text of the Treaty of Sèvres
Treaty text and maps
Treaty of Sevres borders
Tripartite Agreement between the British Empire, France and Italy Respecting Anatolia 10 August, 1920
 

1920 in Armenia
1920 in France
1920 in the Ottoman Empire
Adana vilayet
Adrianople vilayet
Aftermath of World War I in Turkey
Aidin Vilayet
Aleppo vilayet
Bitlis vilayet
Eleftherios Venizelos
David Lloyd George
Woodrow Wilson
Erzurum vilayet
Greco-Turkish War (1919–1922)
History of Kurdistan
Modern history of Turkey
History of Palestine (region)
Hüdavendigâr vilayet
Konya vilayet
Mamuret-ul-Aziz vilayet
Ottoman Empire–United Kingdom relations
Paris Peace Conference (1919–1920)
Sevres
Sevres
Sevres
Sevres
Sevres
Sevres
Sivas vilayet
Sevres
Sevres
Sevres
Sevres
Sevres
Sevres
Sevres
Sevres
Trebizond vilayet
Sevres
Van vilayet
Sevres